Neolycaena davidi  is a small butterfly found in the East Palearctic (Transbaikalia, Mongolia, Northeast China, East Tibet) that belongs to the lycaenids or blues family.

Description from Seitz

davidi Oberth. (73 f ) has on the underside broader and more dispersed white spots, which are not accompanied by distinct dark dots as in nymotypical fengstroemi North China and Mongolia.

Biology
The larva feeds on Caragana microphylla,  C. pygmaea, C. spinosa

Etymology
The name honours Armand David.

See also
List of butterflies of Russia

References

Theclinae